Nangali  is a village in the southern state of Karnataka, India. It is in the Mulbagal taluk of Kolar district.

Demographics
 India census, Nangali had a population of 5973 with 2982 males and 2991 females. The distance between Nangali and Byrakur is around 5 km

Notable people

K.V. Ramdas (Retd SP CID) Judge Nangali Krishnarao Sudhindrarao, judge Karnataka [High Court] Bangalore.
and  one of the famous high school called SVVHS in Mallekuppam road .

See also
Historically it was known as the gate way of Hoysala dynasty ( Hoysalara hebbagilu)
 Kolar
 Districts of Karnataka
It's located on the highway of NH75 ,and border of Karnataka and Andhra Pradesh.

References

External links
 http://Kolar.nic.in/

Villages in Kolar district